Anatoly Mikhaylovich Albul (1 June 1936 – 13, August 2013) was a Russian wrestler. He was born in Leningrad. He was Olympic bronze medalist in Freestyle wrestling in 1960, competing for the Soviet Union. He won a silver medal at the 1963 World Wrestling Championships.

References

External links
 

1936 births
2013 deaths
Sportspeople from Saint Petersburg
Soviet male sport wrestlers
Olympic wrestlers of the Soviet Union
Wrestlers at the 1960 Summer Olympics
Russian male sport wrestlers
Olympic bronze medalists for the Soviet Union
Olympic medalists in wrestling
Medalists at the 1960 Summer Olympics